The AMC-5, originally called GE-5, was a geosynchronous direct-broadcast satellite (DBS) located at 79° West longitude, operated by SES Americom in the Ku-band. It was used by a variety of television customers, including being home to the CBS Newspath service.

The satellite was retired and moved to a graveyard orbit on 17 May 2014 after 15 years of service.

Payload and specifications 

Spacecraft design: Aérospatiale Spacebus 2000
Orbital location: 79° West
Launch Date: 28 October 1998
Vehicle: Ariane 44L
Design life: 15 years
Band: Ku-band
Ku-band payload: 16 x 54 MHz
Transponder type: TWTA, 55 watts
Transponder redundancy: 11 for 8
Receiver redundancy: 4 for 2
Coverage: United States, Canada, Mexico

References 

Communications satellites in geostationary orbit
Spacecraft launched in 1998
SES satellites
Satellites using the Spacebus bus